The Shiva Sahasranama  is a Sanskrit hymn that contains a list of the 1,000 names of Shiva, one of the principal deities of Hinduism and the supreme being in Shaivism. In Hindu tradition, a sahasranama is a type of devotional hymn (Sanskrit: stotram) listing the thousand names of a deity. The names provide an exhaustive catalog of the attributes, functions, and major mythology associated with the figure being praised. The Shiva Sahasranama is found in the Shiva Mahapurana, and many other scriptures, such as Linga Purana.

Variations

There are at least eight different variations of the Shiva Sahasranama while the one appearing in the Book 13 (Anushasana Parva) of the Mahabharata is considered as the main version. One version is contained in the Linga Purana, while another version occurs in the Mahabharata.

Krishna states the thousand names of Shiva to Yudhishthira in the 17th chapter of Anushāsanaparva in the epic Mahabharata.

 Linga Purana (version 1, LP 1.65.54-168) is close to the Mahabharata Anushasanaparvan version.
 Linga Purana (version 2, LP 1.98.27-159) has some passages in common with LP version 1, but also with other sources
 Shivapurana 4.35.1-131.
 Mahabharata (Śāntiparvan version).  The critical edition of the Mahabharata does not include this version; it is considered part of book 12 (Śāntiparvan), but is relegated to Appendix 28 in the critical edition, representing a late addition to the text. The Gita Press edition restores it as part of the main text, as verses 12.284.68-180.
 Vayu Purana (1.30.179-284) is almost the same as the Mahabharata Śāntiparvan version.
 Brahmanda Purana (38.1.1-100) is almost the same as the Vayu Purana version.
Mahābhāgavata Upapurana (67.1-125) appears to be of comparatively recent origin.

References

External links

 Shiva Sahasranama in the Shiva Purana

Shaivism
Sahasranama